Hippocampus coronatus, commonly known as the high-crowned seahorse or crowned seahorse, is a species of fish of the family Syngnathidae. It is endemic to the Pacific coastal waters of Japan (found in shallow coastal waters from Tokyo bay and Sagami bay), where it lives among Zostera seagrasses. Individuals feed mainly on small crustaceans such as gammarid amphipods and copepods, although this can vary by size, with smaller individuals consuming copepods while larger individuals feed on amphipods and mysids. This species is ovoviviparous, with males brooding eggs in a brood pouch before giving birth to live young. Male brood size ranges from 12–46. The International trade in this species has been monitored through Appendix II of the CITES licensing system since 2004 and a minimum size of  applies to traded specimens.

References

Further reading 
 CITES
 iSeahorse
 IUCN Seahorse, Pipefish & Stickleback Specialist Group

Hippocampus (genus)
Fish of Japan
Taxa named by Coenraad Jacob Temminck
Taxa named by Hermann Schlegel
Fish described in 1850
Taxonomy articles created by Polbot